The Agenda is the first studio album by Cold Blank released on 6 August 2012 through Burn the Fire Records. Notable collaborators on the album include Andy Taylor (formerly of Duran Duran) and Blake Miller, with press coverage ranging from MTV Music's "MTV Hive", DJ Times, and Artistdirect. In addition, following the album's release, Cold Blank was nominated in the ‘Top 100 DJs In America’ poll by DJ Times magazine, America’s first magazine dedicated to DJs and DJ culture.

Track listing

References

Cold Blank albums
2012 albums